This page provides supplementary chemical data on carbon tetrachloride.

Material Safety Data Sheet  

The handling of this chemical may incur notable safety precautions. It is highly recommend that you seek the Material Safety Datasheet (MSDS) for this chemical from a reliable source such as SIRI, and follow its directions. MSDS for carbon tetrachloride is available at Fisher Scientific.

Structure and properties

Thermodynamic properties

Vapor pressure of liquid

Table data obtained from CRC Handbook of Chemistry and Physics 47th ed. Note that "(s)" annotation indicates equilibrium temperature of vapor over solid. Otherwise the temperature is equilibrium of vapor over liquid.

Distillation data

Spectral data

References

 

Chemical data pages
Chemical data pages cleanup